Jim Henry may refer to:

Sports
Jim Henry (baseball) (1910–1976), Major League Baseball player
Jim Henry (diver) (born 1948), former American Olympic diver
Jim Henry (equestrian) (born 1947), Canadian Olympic equestrian
Jim Henry (footballer, born 1949), Scottish footballer with Dundee United, Aberdeen and Forfar
Jim Henry (footballer, born 1975), Scottish footballer with Montrose, Clyde and Forfar
Jim Henry (ice hockey) (1920–2004), National Hockey League goalie

Other
Jim Henry (bandit), one of the leaders of the Mason Henry Gang in California in the American Civil War 1864–1865
Jim Henry (musician), American folk singer
Jim Henry (politician) (born 1945), American politician from Tennessee
Jim Henry (coach), former head coach of La Salle Explorers football, 1940–1941
Jim Henry (singer), bass singer of the barbershop quartets Gas House Gang and Crossroads
Jim Henry, candidate in the 1981 Manitoba general election

See also
James Henry (disambiguation)